The National Academy of Agricultural Research Management is a national-level service training institute for ARS cadre located in Hyderabad, Telangana, India.

History
It was established by the Indian Council of Agricultural Research (ICAR) in 1976, to address issues related to agricultural research, training and development and education management, in India. In the initial years, the Academy primarily imparted foundation training to the new entrants of the Agricultural Research Service of the Indian Council of Agricultural Research.

Subsequently, its role expanded to include research, capacity building of senior professionals of national and international NARS (National Agricultural Research Station) in agricultural research and education management, and policy and consultancy support to NARS. The Academy also renders services for building intellectual property (IP) portfolios like patents and geographical indications to various stakeholders including farmers and scientists.

Functional Areas/ Divisions of Management

There are six divisions within the academy: Agribusiness Management, Education Systems Management, Extension Systems Management, Human Resources Management, Information and Communication Management, and Research Systems Management.

Former Directors 

Dr.B.N.Mathur - (01.11.2002 - 10.02.2004)
 Dr.S.Prakash Tiwari (03.05.2005 - 12.07.2006)
 Dr.S.M.Ilyas (08.02.2007 - 31.07.2009)
 Dr.P.K.Joshi (19.09.2009 - 31.03.2011)
 Dr.S.L.Goswami (21.12.2011 - 30.06.2014)

See also 
Genome Valley
Education in India
Literacy in India
List of institutions of higher education in Telangana

References

External links

Research institutes in Hyderabad, India
Universities and colleges in Hyderabad, India
1976 establishments in Andhra Pradesh
Research institutes established in 1976
Agricultural research institutes in India